Ptinus is a genus of beetles distributed throughout much of the world, including Africa, the Australian region, the Palearctic, the Near East, the Nearctic, and the Neotropical realm. It is a member of the subfamily Ptininae, the spider beetles.

About 24 species have been found associated with stored food products in various parts of the world. Both adults and larvae of which feed on grain, dried fruit, spices and other dried foodstuffs. The sub-species Ptinus tectus is considered a pest species in Museums and can damage stored objects and collections.

Taxa include:

Subgenus Bruchoptinus
Ptinus antennatus
Ptinus biformis
Ptinus brevivittis
Ptinus femoralis
Ptinus italicus
Ptinus ivanensis
Ptinus palliatus
Ptinus pellitus
Ptinus rufipes
Ptinus schatzmayeri
Ptinus torretassoi
Subgenus Cyphoderes
Ptinus bidens
Ptinus hirticornis
Ptinus japonicus
Ptinus raptor
Ptinus schlerethi
Subgenus Gynopterus
Ptinus aubei
Ptinus barrosi
Ptinus bertranpetiti
Ptinus crassicornis
Ptinus dubius
Ptinus hispaniolaensis
Ptinus paulonotatus
Ptinus pyrenaeus
Ptinus salvatori
Ptinus sexpunctatus
Ptinus subroseus
Ptinus tumidus
Ptinus variegatus
Subgenus Pseudoptinus
Ptinus arragonicus
Ptinus auberti
Ptinus capellae
Ptinus coarcticollis
Ptinus cumaniensis
Ptinus kutzschenbachi
Ptinus lichenum
Ptinus maculosus
Ptinus madoni
Ptinus nikitanus
Ptinus oertzeni
Ptinus rufolimbatus
Ptinus rugosicollis
Ptinus spissicornis
Ptinus subaeneus
Ptinus tauricus
Subgenus Ptinus
Ptinus affinis
Ptinus argolisanus
Ptinus atricapillus
Ptinus bicinctus
Ptinus calcaratus
Ptinus calcarifer
Ptinus corsicus
Ptinus ellipticus
Ptinus explanatus
Ptinus fur – whitemarked spider beetle
Ptinus gylippus
Ptinus kiesenwetteri
Ptinus kruperi
Ptinus latro
Ptinus leprieuri
Ptinus mediterraneus
Ptinus nigripennis
Ptinus obesus
Ptinus perplexus
Ptinus perrini
Ptinus phlomidis
Ptinus pilosus
Ptinus podolicus
Ptinus pusillus
Ptinus reitteri
Ptinus rufus
Ptinus spitzyi
Ptinus subpilosus
Ptinus tarsalis
Ptinus timidus
Ptinus villiger
Subgenus Tectoptinus
Ptinus exulans
Ptinus tectus – Australian spider beetle

See also
 List of Ptinus species

References

 
Ptinidae